Trash Boat is a British punk rock band formed in St Albans in 2014. The group consists of Tobi Duncan (lead vocals), Dann Bostock (rhythm guitar, backing vocals),  Ryan Hyslop (lead guitar), James Grayson (bass, backing vocals), and Oakley Moffatt (drums).

The group has released two EPs and three studio albums. Look Alive was released independently in 2014, while Brainwork was released after signing with Hopeless Records in 2015. The band's debut album, Nothing I Write You Can Change What You've Been Through, was released on 17 June 2016; their second, Crown Shyness, was released on 20 July 2018; and the band's latest album Don't You Feel Amazing? was released on 13 August 2021.

History

Formation and debut EP (2014)
The group was formed in St Albans in 2014, taking its name from an episode of Regular Show. The band independently released its first EP, Look Alive, 23 June 2014.

Signing and Nothing I Write You Can Change What You've Been Through (2015–2017)
On 17 March 2015, Trash Boat announced its signing to Hopeless Records and released an EP titled Brainwork on 18 May 2015. On 24 May 2015, the group performed at the 2015 Slam Dunk Festival. In August 2015, Trash Boat supported New Found Glory on a tour in England. The band's debut album, Nothing I Write You Can Change What You've Been Through, was released on 17 June 2016. The group performed at the 2016 Reading and Leeds Festivals. Throughout December of the same year, Trash Boat supported Beartooth on the group's UK tour.

Crown Shyness (2018–2020)

The band announced their second studio album, Crown Shyness, on 14 May 2018 alongside the lead single "Shade". The album was released on 20 July, debuting at No. 2 on Billboard's Heatseekers Albums Chart.

Trash Boat then released the single "Synthetic Sympathy" on 29 August 2019. The Band covered the Linkin Park song "Given Up" for the compilation album Songs that Saved my Life Vol 2

Don't You Feel Amazing? (2021–present) 
In February 2021, Trash Boat released the single "He's So Good" as well as merchandise inspired by the song. The profit from these designs is being donated to LGBTQ+ Youth charity group AKT.

Musical style and influences
The group's music has been characterized as pop punk, melodic hardcore, skate punk and post-hardcore however heavier than a majority of their peers thanks to a "purer and grittier style", Duncan's raw and emotional voice and their punk (rather than pop)-leanings. All of the band members have been influenced by pop punk and punk artists while vocalist Tobi Duncan's interests in hardcore punk and metal music and Bostock's ska influence have also shaped the group's sound. The band have also cited influences from bands such as Have Heart, Trophy Eyes, Turnstile, La Dispute, Can't Swim, Movements, Title Fight, the Misfits, the Sex Pistols, Rise Against, Thrice, Blink-182 and Sum 41. Duncan has cited the poets W. B. Yeats and Emily Brontë as a major influence on his lyric writing.

Band members
Tobi Duncan – lead vocals (2014–present)
Dann Bostock – rhythm guitar, backing vocals (2014–present)
Ryan Hyslop – lead guitar (2014–present)
James Grayson – bass guitar, backing vocals (2014–present)
Oakley Moffatt – drums  (2014–present)

Discography

Studio albums 

Extended plays 

Singles

Music videos

References

English pop punk groups
Musical groups established in 2014
Hopeless Records artists
British pop punk groups
Musical groups from St Albans
2014 establishments in England